The Montgomery Township School District is a comprehensive public school district, consisting of five school facilities, that serves students in pre-kindergarten through twelfth grade from Montgomery Township and Rocky Hill, in Somerset County, New Jersey, United States. Rocky Hill was a non-operating school district whose school children had attended the Montgomery Township schools as part of a sending/receiving relationship, but has since been incorporated into the school district. Montgomery Township had been one of the fastest-growing school districts in New Jersey. In September 1992, the K-12 enrollment was 1,590 compared to 4,924 in September 2005, tripling in just more than a decade.

As of the 2020–21 school year, the district, comprised of five schools, had an enrollment of 4,498 students and 403.1 classroom teachers (on an FTE basis), for a student–teacher ratio of 11.2:1.

The district is classified by the New Jersey Department of Education as being in District Factor Group "J", the highest of eight groupings. District Factor Groups organize districts statewide to allow comparison by common socioeconomic characteristics of the local districts. From lowest socioeconomic status to highest, the categories are A, B, CD, DE, FG, GH, I and J.

Awards and recognition
For the 1992-93 school year, Montgomery High School was formally designated as a National Blue Ribbon School of Excellence, the highest honor that an American school can achieve. Montgomery Middle School was recognized as a Blue Ribbon School for the 1999-2000 school year.

The Montgomery Township School District has been ranked among the best schools in New Jersey. Montgomery Township's schools were ranked as "the best bang for the buck" (New Jersey Monthly magazine), referring to the high achievement of students with a relatively low spending per pupil (compared to other school districts in New Jersey). Montgomery High School was the 4th ranked public high school in New Jersey out of 316 schools statewide, in New Jersey Monthly magazine's September 2006 cover story on the state's Top Public High Schools.

Schools
Schools in the district (with 2020–21 enrollment data from the National Center for Education Statistics) are:
Elementary schools
Orchard Hill Elementary School with 727 students in grades PreK-2
Daniel Van Hise, Principal
Village Elementary School with 634 students in grades 3-4
Susan Lacy, Principal
Middle schools
Montgomery Lower Middle School with 743 students in grades 5-6
Michael Richards, Principal
Montgomery Upper Middle School with 776 students in grades 7-8
Cory M. Delgado, Principal
High school
Montgomery High School with 1,577 students in grades 9-12
Heather Pino-Beattie, Principal

Administration
Core members of the district's administration are:
Mary E. McLoughlin, Superintendent
Alicia M. Schauer, Business Administrator / Board Secretary

Board of education
The district's board of education, comprised of nine members, sets policy and oversees the fiscal and educational operation of the district through its administration. As a Type II school district, the board's trustees are elected directly by voters to serve three-year terms of office on a staggered basis, with three seats up for election each year held (since 2013) as part of the November general election. The board appoints a superintendent to oversee the district's day-to-day operations and a business administrator to supervise the business functions of the district.

References

External links
Montgomery Township School District

Data for the Montgomery Township School District, National Center for Education Statistics

Montgomery Township, New Jersey
Rocky Hill, New Jersey
New Jersey District Factor Group J
School districts in Somerset County, New Jersey